Steven López (born November 9, 1978) is an American taekwondo competitor, a 2000 and 2004 Olympic gold medalist (in the -68 and -80 kg divisions, respectively) and a 2008 Olympic bronze medalist (again in the -80 kg division) and 4th Dan in taekwondo. In 2001, he won the Lightweight Taekwondo World Championship, and in 2003 he won the Welterweight Taekwondo World Championship which he has since won in 2005, 2007 and 2009 making him the first Taekwondo fighter to win 5 World Championships. With 2 Olympic titles, 5 titles in taekwondo world championships and 1 title in taekwondo world cup he is the most titled champion after Hadi Saei who earns 9 world class titles (two Olympic titles in 2004 and 2008, two world championships titles, four world cup titles and one world Olympic qualification tournament).

Biography
López was born on November 9, 1978, in New York City to Nicaraguans parents. His parents, Julio and Ondina, immigrated from Nicaragua to the United States in 1973. His father took odd jobs to support his family but later relocated to Texas. López first learned the sport of Taekwondo in his garage at the age of five from his father and Jean, his older brother. He is a 1997 graduate of Kempner High School in Sugar Land, Texas where he was voted "most likely to succeed" and was member of the National Honor Society.

López's siblings, Mark, Diana and Jean López (coach), are all USA National Team Members in Taekwondo. His younger siblings, Mark and Diana, also represented the United States at the 2008 Beijing Olympics, marking the first time since 1904 that three siblings have been on the same Olympic team. Both López and siblings, Mark (men's featherweight) and Diana (women's featherweight), made sports history in April 2005 when they all claimed a world championship title at the same event (2005 World Taekwondo Championships) with their oldest brother, Jean, participating in the feat as their coach. Steven Lopez and Diana Lopez both qualified for the 2012 Olympic games in London in July 2012 at the Olympic Training Center in Colorado Springs, CO.

In January 2006, López tested positive for a banned substance (L-methamphetamine) which he said came from an over-the-counter vapor inhaler he used. López promptly accepted a three-month suspension and participated in an educational anti-doping program.

López has appeared in People Magazine's 50 Most Beautiful People. In 2012, he participated in Fox's dating game show The Choice.

López is a Roman Catholic who attends St. Theresa Catholic Church in Sugar Land, Texas, and has said his faith has always been a very important part of his life.

Allegations of sexual misconduct and sexual assault
On June 8, 2017, USA Today published a news items stating that López had been accused of sexual assault and drugging of various female athletes. The accusations presented a repeated pattern of behavior of abuse allegedly perpetrated by López and his brother, Jean Lopez. As of 2020, López and his brother have a preliminary suspension in place enacted by USA Taekwondo which effectively bars them from competing in international Taekwondo competitions.

Career highlights

2015 Grand Prix: BRONZE
2015 Pan American Games: BRONZE
2014 Grand Prix: SILVER
2014 USA Open: GOLD
2013 Argentina Open: GOLD
2009 World Taekwondo Championships (Welter): GOLD
2008 Beijing Summer Olympics: BRONZE
2007 World Taekwondo Championships (Welter): GOLD
2007 Sr. National Team Trials (Welter): 1st
2005 U.S. Olympic Committee Male Athlete of the Month (April)
2004 Athens Summer Olympics: GOLD
2004 US Olympic Team Trials: GOLD
2004 Sullivan Award Finalist
2003 World Taekwondo Championships: GOLD
2003 World Taekwondo Qualification Tournament: BRONZE
2003 Pan American Games: GOLD
2003 Sullivan Award Finalist
2002 World Cup Taekwondo Championships: BRONZE
2002 Pan American Games: GOLD
2001 World Taekwondo Championships: GOLD
2000 Sydney Summer Olympics: GOLD
1999 Pan American Games: GOLD
1999 Pan American Regional Olympic Qualifier: GOLD
1998 World Cup Taekwondo Championships: BRONZE
1998 Pan American Taekwondo Championships: GOLD
1997 World Cup Taekwondo Championships: GOLD
1996 Pan American Taekwondo Championships: GOLD
1996 World Junior Taekwondo Championships: GOLD
1995 Pan American Taekwondo Championships: SILVER
1994 World Cup Taekwondo Championships: BRONZE
1993 Jr. Olympic: BRONZE

See also
 List of athletes with the most appearances at Olympic Games

Footnotes

External links
 
USA Taekwondo profile
The Road to Beijing 2008
Interactive 3D Taekwondo training program, featuring López

1978 births
American male taekwondo practitioners
American sportsmen
Living people
Kempner High School alumni
Sportspeople from New York City
Nicaraguan emigrants to the United States
Participants in American reality television series
Taekwondo practitioners at the 2000 Summer Olympics
Taekwondo practitioners at the 2004 Summer Olympics
Taekwondo practitioners at the 2008 Summer Olympics
Taekwondo practitioners at the 2012 Summer Olympics
Taekwondo practitioners at the 2016 Summer Olympics
Olympic gold medalists for the United States in taekwondo
Olympic bronze medalists for the United States in taekwondo
Medalists at the 2000 Summer Olympics
Medalists at the 2004 Summer Olympics
Medalists at the 2008 Summer Olympics
Taekwondo practitioners at the 2011 Pan American Games
Taekwondo practitioners at the 2015 Pan American Games
Pan American Games gold medalists for the United States
Pan American Games medalists in taekwondo
World Taekwondo Championships medalists
Taekwondo practitioners at the 1999 Pan American Games
Medalists at the 2015 Pan American Games